Gary Cormack (born  in Kenora, Ontario) is a Canadian wheelchair curler, 2006 Winter Paralympics champion.

Teams

References

External links 

Recognizing Champions - Richmond Curling Centre

Living people
1950 births
Sportspeople from Kenora
Canadian male curlers
Curlers from Ontario
Curlers from British Columbia
Canadian wheelchair curlers
Paralympic wheelchair curlers of Canada
Paralympic gold medalists for Canada
Paralympic medalists in wheelchair curling
Wheelchair curlers at the 2006 Winter Paralympics
Medalists at the 2006 Winter Paralympics
Canadian wheelchair curling champions